The 1994 WAFU Club Championship was the 17th  football club tournament season that took place for the runners-up or third place of each West African country's domestic league, the West African Club Championship. It was won again by Nigeria's Bendel Insurance after defeating Plateau United in two legs, it was the first final that feature both clubs from a single country.  A total of about 46 goals were scored, slightly more but not as much as it was in 1991.  No penalty shootout took place that season not even a club advanced under away goals rule. Originally a 22 match season, it was reduced to a 16 match as the Gambia's Real de Banjul FC and Niger's Alkali Nassara withdrew, in the quarterfinals, Liberia's Mighty Barolle withdrew. Neither clubs from Senegal, Guinea-Bissau, Mauritania nor Ghana participated.  From the quarterfinals, Bendel Insurance directly headed to the finals.

Preliminary round

}
|}

Quarterfinals

|}

Semifinals

|}

Finals

|}

Winners

See also
1994 African Cup of Champions Clubs
1994 CAF Cup Winners' Cup
1994 CAF Cup

References

External links
Full results of the 1994 WAFU Club Championship at RSSSF

West African Club Championship
1994 in African football